Zak Madell (born March 28, 1994) is a Canadian wheelchair rugby player, classified as impairment sport class 3.5, who made his international debut at the 2011 Americas qualification Tournament. He has since participated at London Paralympic Games, at 2014 IWRF World Championship in Odense, Denmark, (where he was elected as the MVP) and Toronto 2015 Parapan American Games.

References

External links
 
 

1994 births
Living people
Canadian wheelchair rugby players
Sportspeople from Edmonton
Paralympic silver medalists for Canada
Medalists at the 2012 Summer Paralympics
Paralympic medalists in wheelchair rugby
Wheelchair rugby players at the 2012 Summer Paralympics
Paralympic wheelchair rugby players of Canada